= Akisutozeneko =

Japanese fortune telling method

Akisutozeneko (Japanese: あきすとぜねこ or アキストゼネコ) is a love fortune telling method. It was mainly used by girls in the Shōwa era.

Each character in the name of this fortune-telling method is associated with a word: a for aishiteiru ("to love"), ki for kirai ("to dislike"), su for suki ("to like"), to for tomodachi ("friend"), ze for zekkō ("break up"), ne for netsuretsu ("passionate"), and ko for koibito ("lover"). These initials form the name Akisutozeneko.

== Rules ==
Akisutozeneko is performed by changing the letters of the names of a couple into numbers. For example, given two people named Hyakka Saburou (百科 三郎) and Jiten Hanami (事典 花美):

#	Hyakka Saburou (百科 三郎)								Jiten Hanami (事典 花美)					
1	ひ	や	つ	か	さ	ぶ	ろ	う	じ	て	ん	は	な	み
	hi	ya	tsu	ka	sa	bu	ro	u	ji	te	n	ha	na	mi
2	2	1	3	1	1	3	5	3	2	4	1	1	1	2
3			3			3	5	3		4				
4	14								4					

1. The names of the couple in question are written out in hiragana. "Small" hiragana are written out as their full-sized counterparts. For example, Hyakka (ひゃっか) is written as Hiyatsuka (ひやつか).
2. All vowels and the character ん (n) are changed into numbers (a=1, i=2, u=3, e=4, o=5, n=1). In this example, Hiyatsuka Saburou = 21311353 and Jiten Hanami = 241112.
3. After converting the names into numbers, any numbers that both names share are erased. In this example, both people have 1's and 2's in their name. Therefore, all 1's and 2's are erased.
4. The remaining numbers are added for each person. In this example, Hyakka Saburou's total is 3 + 3 + 5 + 3 = 14. Jiten Hanami's total is 4.
5. Each number corresponds with a character:
  1 = あ (a)
  2 = き (ki)
  3 = す (su)
  4 = と (to)
  5 = ぜ (ze)
  6 = ね (ne)
  7 = こ (ko)
  8 = あ (a)
  9 = き (ki), etc.
  In this example, Hyakka Saburou's number is 14, so his character will be こ (ko). Jiten Hanami's number is 4, so her character will be 4 = と (to).
6. A word is then associated with the character according to the table below:

Character	Word associated with character
あ (a)	Love (愛している, aishiteiru)
き (ki)	Dislike (嫌い, kirai)
す (su)	Like (好き, suki)
と (to)	Friend (友達, tomodachi)
ぜ (ze)	Break up (絶交, zekkō)
ね (ne)	Passionate (熱烈, netsuretsu)
こ (ko)	Lover (恋人, koibito)

In this example, the result is "Hyakka Saburou thinks of Jiten Hanami as a lover, but Jiten Hanami thinks of Hyakka Saburou as a friend".
If step 4 cannot be performed because all numbers were erased in step 3, then the meaning is "fated person".
